The Military Heritage Museum is a military museum in Punta Gorda, Florida.

Museum History 
The museum first opened at its original location on Pearl Harbor Day, 2001. Since then, it has grown and moved twice, coming to its current location in 2019.

Partnerships

Memberships 

 American Association of Museums
 Florida Association of Museums
 Charlotte County Chamber of Commerce
 Punta Gorda Chamber of Commerce
 Greater Englewood Chamber of Commerce
 Arts & Humanities Council of Charlotte County
 Charlotte County Veterans Council

Other Partnerships 

 American Legion Post 103
 Disabled American Veterans
 Disabled American Veterans, Chapter 82
 Florida International Air Show
 Southwest Florida Honor Flight
 Women in Military Service for America Memorial
 Women's Vietnam Memorial
 Witness to War Foundation
 Vietnam Wall of Southwest Florida, Inc.
Charlotte Community Foundation

Library 
The museum contains its own library, which contains over five thousand volumes of military history, technology, biographies, and narratives.

References

Punta Gorda, Florida
Museums in Charlotte County, Florida
Military and war museums in Florida